The South West College operates in Northern Ireland on four campuses in Cookstown, Dungannon, Enniskillen and Omagh and, of the six new area based colleges, it is the smallest in size, but it covers the largest geographical area of counties Tyrone and Fermanagh.

The South West College has 18,500 student enrolments, is involved in a number of European projects, has a staffing complement of some 500 full-time staff and a similar number of part-time staff and a budget of £32 Million.

References

External links
South West College Website

Universities and colleges in Northern Ireland
Cookstown